Rugby union in Barbados is a minor, but relatively successful sport.   There are fewer than 1700 registered rugby union players in Barbados and only five official IRB sanctioned teams.  The governing body for rugby union in Barbados is the Barbados Rugby Football Union, and their headquarters is located in Wildey, St. Michael.

History and Governing body
Rugby union has had a long history in Barbados, though there was originally only the one formally organised team, called the Barbados Rugby Union. In 1995 they wished to become a member of the International Rugby Board (IRB). Barbados then formed a Union with a number of clubs, three: Scorpions, Renegades and Barbados Defence Force. Since then other teams, Tridents and Emperors, have been formed. The Defence Force team is no longer active. There is also an active junior program, involving players from several secondary schools (St. Michael's School, Christ Church Foundation, Harrison College, and Garrison Secondary.) The Barbados Rugby Football Union is the recognized governing body for the sport in Barbados.

National team
The Barbados national rugby union team is currently ranked 68th in the International Rugby Board's world rankings.

Sevens team
The Barbados national sevens team competed at the rugby sevens event in the Commonwealth Games 2014 in Glasgow.

References

External links
 Barbados on IRB.com
Rugby Barbados
Barbados Rugby Football Union (BRFU)
 Official Website for Rugby Bahamas
NAWIRA Barbados Page
Barbados on rugbydata.com
 Archives du Rugby: Barbade